Thomas Adams (1730 — January 1764), British Army major, posthumously promoted to Brigadier-general based on accounts of his defence of the British position in Bengal in 1763.

Biography
Adams commenced his military service in 1747 as a volunteer with the army under the command of the Duke of Cumberland in the Netherlands. On 25 June of the same year he obtained a commission as ensign in the 37th Foot, in which regiment he rose to the rank of captain nine years later. He was subsequently transferred to the 84th Foot, and was serving as a major in that regiment in India, when, in 1762, five years after the Battle of Plassey, he was appointed to the command of the united forces of the crown and of the East India Company in Bengal.

It was a very critical period in British Indian history. Notwithstanding the victory at Plassey, the British power was by no means so completely established as to be free from the risk of overthrow. Clive was in England. Mir Qasim, the astute minister and son-in-law of that Mir Jafar whom Clive had placed upon the throne of Bengal in place of Siraj ud-Daulah, had in turn displaced his master and had been formally invested as Nawab at Patna in the previous year. The vices of venality and corruption which Clive, himself by no means over-scrupulous, had described as the chief dangers to British rule in India, were rampant in the Calcutta council chamber. By the unscrupulous action of the council and by the rapacity of the subordinate servants of the company trade was disorganised, the nawáb was deprived of his revenues, and the British name was rapidly becoming synonymous with oppression and fraud.

Disputes on the subject of transit duties and an unjustifiable attack made by Mr. Ellis, one of the members of the council, upon the city of Patna, followed by the death of Mr. Amyatt, who had been sent as an envoy to the nawáb, and who was killed by the troops of the latter when resisting an attempt to make him prisoner, brought on war between the company and the nawáb. The forces of the latter numbered 40,000 men, including 25,000 infantry trained and disciplined on the European system, and a regiment of excellent artillerymen well supplied with guns. To oppose this force, Major Adams had under his command a small body of troops, variously estimated at from 2,300 to 3,000, of whom only 850 were Europeans. His artillery also was inferior to that of the enemy. The campaign commenced on 2 July 1763, and lasted for four months, in the course of which Adams fought four actions, took two considerable forts and nearly 500 pieces of cannon, and totally defeated the most powerful Bengali army that up to that time had confronted the British in India.

Key engagements included the Battle of Gheriah in August 1763. This lasted for four hours; the issue was at one time doubtful, the nawáb's troops breaking through a portion of the English line and capturing two guns, but the gallantry of the Europeans and steadiness of the sepoys under Adams's generalship saved the day, and the enemy were compelled to retreat with the loss of all their guns and stores. Another engagement was the Battle of Udhanala in September 1763: Adams pursued Qasim's troops to the gates of Monghyr and then besieged Patna where he was victorious but not before Qasim had killed some 60 British prisoners. Adams followed Qasim's remaining sepoys for a few more days and then returned to Calcutta having conquered the whole of Bengal in just a few months.

At the close of the campaign Major Adams was compelled by ill-health to resign his command, and died at Calcutta in January 1764. As soon as the intelligence of the campaign reached England, Adams was advanced to the rank of brigadier-general, but he had already been dead some months when his commission was issued. Adams died in Calcutta in January 1764.

Notes

References

1730s births
1764 deaths
37th Regiment of Foot officers
84th Regiment of Foot officers
British Army brigadiers
British Army personnel of the War of the Austrian Succession
British Commanders-in-Chief of India
British East India Company Army officers